Desiree Guillermina Glod John (born 28 September 1982 in Miranda) is a volleyball player from Venezuela, who competed for her native country at the 2008 Summer Olympics in Beijing, China. Her team ended up in 8th place.

Career
Playing at the 2005/2006 season at the Spanish Superliga Femenina de Voleibol with the team Maspalomas Costa Canaria, Glod finished the season as the Best Scorer.

The next season she helped Ícaro Alaró to get the promotion to Superliga, winning the Liga FEV Championship.

Glod won with her national team the silver medal at the 2009 Bolivarian Games.

Clubs
  Calzada Gijón (2002–2003)
  Maspalomas Costa Canaria (2005–2006)
  Ícaro Alaró (2006–2007)
  Universitat de València (2007–2008)
  Palma Volley (2008–2009)
  Magliano Trasformatori Chieri (2009–2010)
  Banca Reale Yoyogurt Giaveno (2010–2011)
  Assitur Corriere Espresso Soverato (2011–2012)
  Crovegli Volley (2012–2013)
  Academicas de Caracas (2013)
  Salihli Belediyesi (2014-2015)
  Vikingas de Miranda (2015)
  ACD Túpac Amaru (2015-2016)

Awards

Individual
 2005/2006 Superliga Femenina de Voleibol "Best Scorer"
 2008 Pan-American Cup "Best Scorer"

National team

Senior team
 2002 Central American and Caribbean Games  Silver medal
 2005 Bolivarian Games -  Silver medal
 2007 South American Championship -  Bronze medal
 2009 Bolivarian Games -  Silver medal
 2013 Bolivarian Games -  Silver medal

Clubs
 2006–2007 Liga FEV -  Champion, with Ícaro Alaró
 2008–2009 Superliga Femenina de Voleibol - Runner-up, with Palma Volley

References

External links
 FIVB profile

1982 births
Living people
Olympic volleyball players of Venezuela
Venezuelan women's volleyball players
Venezuelan expatriate sportspeople in Spain
Venezuelan expatriate sportspeople in Italy
Venezuelan expatriate sportspeople in Turkey
Venezuelan expatriate sportspeople in Peru
Expatriate volleyball players in Spain
Volleyball players at the 2008 Summer Olympics
Central American and Caribbean Games silver medalists for Venezuela
Competitors at the 2002 Central American and Caribbean Games
Central American and Caribbean Games medalists in volleyball
People from Miranda (state)
20th-century Venezuelan women
21st-century Venezuelan women